Winchester is a town in Litchfield County, Connecticut, United States. The population was 10,224 at the 2020 census. The city of Winsted is located in Winchester.

History
Winchester was incorporated on May 21, 1771, and named after Winchester in England.

Geography
The town is in northeastern Litchfield County and is bordered to the south by the city of Torrington. Winsted, with a population of 7,321 by far the largest community in Winchester, is in the eastern part of the town.

Highland Lake, Crystal Lake, and Lake Winchester are three of the larger water bodies in the town. The Still River, a tributary of the Farmington River, flows from south to north through the eastern side of the town.

Principal communities
Winchester Center
Winsted

Demographics

At the 2000 census there were 10,664 people, 4,371 households, and 2,849 families living in the town. The racial makeup of the town was 94.44% White, 1.24% African American, 0.23% Native American, 0.93% Asian, 0.01% Pacific Islander, 1.69% from other races, and 1.46% from two or more races. Hispanic or Latino people of any race were 3.17%.

Of the 4,371 households 28.3% had children under the age of 18 living with them, 50.3% were married couples living together, 10.2% had a female householder with no husband present, and 34.8% were non-families. 28.0% of households were one person and 11.9% were one person aged 65 or older.  The average household size was 2.42 and the average family size was 2.97.

The age distribution was 23.3% under the age of 18, 7.1% from 18 to 24, 29.4% from 25 to 44, 25.0% from 45 to 64, and 15.2% 65 or older.  The median age was 40 years. For every 100 females, there were 94.0 males.  For every 100 females age 18 and over, there were 90.5 males.

The median household income was $46,671 and the median family income  was $57,866. Males had a median income of $41,076 versus $28,058 for females. The per capita income for the town was $22,589.  About 4.3% of families and 6.7% of the population were below the poverty line, including 9.9% of those under age 18 and 7.4% of those age 65 or over.

Transportation

The town is served by buses of the Northwestern Connecticut Transit District.

The city of Winsted is located at the junction of Connecticut Route 8 and U.S. Route 44. Route 263 connects Winchester Center and Winsted.

Education

Winchester Public Schools is the public school district for elementary grades while Gilbert School serves as the public school for secondary grades. Prior to 2011 middle school students went to the Winchester district.

Northwestern Regional School District No. 7 maintains Northwestern Regional High School, which is partly in Winsted. However the school does not serve residents of Winchester.

There is a charter school, Explorations Charter School.

There was also a parochial Catholic school, St. Anthony School, of the Roman Catholic Diocese of Hartford. It opened in 1865.  it had about 200 students. By 2020 this figure declined to 90. It closed in 2020. At the time it was the oldest school continually operated by the archdiocese.

Northwestern Connecticut Community College is in Winsted.

Notable people

 Phineas Miner (1777–1839), congressman from Connecticut; born in Winchester

References

External links

Town of Winchester official website
Northwestern Connecticut Community College in Winsted
Winsted Area Ambulance Association

 
Towns in Litchfield County, Connecticut
Towns in the New York metropolitan area
Towns in Connecticut